Jesse Sheron Williams (February 5, 1923 – January 31, 1996) was an American Negro league catcher in the 1940s.

A native of Meridian, Mississippi, Williams made his Negro leagues debut in 1944 with the Cleveland Buckeyes. He played with the club during its 1945 Negro World Series championship season, and finished his career with Cleveland in 1947. Williams died in Chicago, Illinois in 1996 at age 72.

References

External links
 and Seamheads

1923 births
1996 deaths
Chicago American Giants players
Cleveland Buckeyes players
20th-century African-American sportspeople
Baseball catchers